Typhoon Thompson in Search for the Sea Child is a video game created by Dan Gorlin.  It was published by Broderbund for the Atari ST in 1988, then the Amiga in 1990. Typhoon Thompson is a reworking of the Apple II game Airheart, also written by Gorlin.

Airheart uses the 16-color "Double High Res" graphics mode available in the enhanced Apple IIe and Apple IIc (and, later, Apple IIGS).

Reception
The game was ranked the 24th best game of all time by Amiga Power.

References

External links
Typhoon Thompson at Atari Mania
Typhoon Thompson at Lemon Amiga
STart Vol.3 No.6 review of Typhoon Thompson (Atari ST).

1988 video games
Amiga games
Atari ST games
Broderbund games
Third-person shooters
Video games developed in the United States
Single-player video games